Runaway is the sixth and last studio album by the Dutch rock group Solution. It was released in 1982 on CBS Records.

History
Runaway has eight songs in a shorter, more direct format than previous recordings. Earlier songs like "Empty Faces" (1977) and "It's Only Just Begun" (1980) had hinted at a more commercial approach, and Runaway continued this trend to the extreme. Unlike their previous five albums, it did not include any instrumental tracks.

Jim Capaldi of Traffic co-produced the album with the band. Capaldi also wrote or co-wrote the lyrics to seven of the eight songs. He covered two of the songs, "Runaway" and "Bad Breaks", on his next solo album, Fierce Heart.

Runaway entered the chart in the Netherlands on 13 March 1982, reaching #14 and spending 9 weeks on the chart. The title track was also a hit when released as a single.

Four songs from Runaway appeared on Solution Live the following year; this album and the four remaining studio tracks were included on The Ultimate Collection in 2006.

Track listing
"Run Away" (3:50)
Music: Solution
Lyrics: J. Capaldi, H. Waterman
"Shame On You" (4:28)
Music: Solution
Lyrics: J. Capaldi
"Move On" (4:23)
Music: Solution
G. Willemse, J. Capaldi
"Evil Love" (5:07)
Music: G. Willemse
Lyrics: J. Capaldi
Arr. Solution
"Bad Breaks" (4:43)
Music: W.T. Ennes
Lyrics: J. Capaldi
"Who's to Blame" (4:57)
Music: G. Willemse-arr. Solution
Lyrics: G. Willemse, J. Capaldi
"Down Hearted!" (4:15)
Music & lyrics: G. & B. McDonough, S. Higgins
"Lovin' You Was Easy" (4:44)
Music: G. Willemse
Lyrics: G. Willemse, J. Capaldi

Credits
Tom Barlage: altosax, keyboards, percussion
Willem Ennes: keyboards
Harry Hardholt: guitars
Hans Waterman: drums, percussion
Gus Willemse: bass guitar, vocals

Produced by Jim Capaldi and Solution.
Recorded at the Spitsbergen Studiom, the Netherlands
Engineering by T. Barlage, W. Ennes.
Basic track "Shame On You" recorded at the Triple Sound Studio, Driebergen, the Netherlands

Airbrush: Ph. M. Awuy
Lettertype: H. Schutten
Photography: K. de Jong
Art direction: H. de Jong
Design: W. van Ginkel

External links
Official website run by Guus Willemse

1982 albums
Solution (band) albums
Columbia Records albums